Zhu Gui (25 August 1374 – 29 December 1446), initially known by his title as Prince of Yu (豫王, 1378–1392), later changed to Prince of Dai (代王), was an imperial prince of the Chinese Ming dynasty. He was the 13th son of Hongwu Emperor with his concubine,  Consort Hui.

Family 
Consorts and Issue:
 Lady, of the Xu clan (徐氏; d. 1427), primary consort, second daughter of Xu Da
 Zhu Xuntuan, Prince Li of Dai (代戾王 朱遜煓; 1393–1418), first son
 Zhu Xunmin, Prince Rongxu of Guangling (廣靈榮虛王 朱遜𤇜; 1402–1459), second son
 Zhu Xunchen, Prince Kanghui of Shanyin (山陰康惠 朱遜煁; 1409–1467), fourth son
 Lady, of the Lü clan (呂氏)
 Zhu Xun?, Prince Xishun of Lucheng (潞城僖順王 朱遜𤆼; 1407–1471), third son
 Lady, of the Xu clan (徐氏)
 Zhu Xunliao, Prince Jingzhuang of Xuanning (宣寧靖莊王 朱遜炓; 1423–1470), seventh son
 Zhu Xunhui, Prince Rongding of Huairen (懷仁榮定王 朱遜烠; 1425–1490), eight son
 Zhu Xunliu, Prince Yian of Xichuan (隰川懿安王 朱遜熮; 1429–1474), tenth son
 Lady, of the Liu clan (劉氏)
 Unknown
 Zhu Xuntan, Prince Gongjian of Xiangyuan (襄垣恭簡王 朱遜燂; 1410–1462), fifth son
 Zhu Xunquan, Prince Rongshun of Lingqiu (靈丘榮順王 朱遜烇; 1410–1462), sixth son
 Zhu Xunhu (朱遜熩), ninth son
 Zhu Yunfan (朱遜燔), eleventh son
 Princess Xingning (乡宁郡主), fourth daughter
 Princess Huguan (壶关郡主), sixth daughter
 Princess Baode (保德郡主), seventh daughter

References

See also 
 List of vassals prince peerages of Ming dynasty

1374 births
1446 deaths
Ming dynasty imperial princes
Sons of emperors